Jukka Rantala is a retired Finnish association football player who played professionally in Finland and the USL A-League.

Rantal spent his entire career in the Finnish leagues except for the 2001 season.  That year, he played for the Charleston Battery in the USL A-League.   On April 9, 2002, Rantala returned to Haka.  Rantala gained his greatest success with FC Haka.  In 1998, Haka won the league title.  The team also won the 1997 and 2002 Finnish Cup.  The 1998 victory put them into the 1998–99 UEFA Cup Winners' Cup where they fell to Panionios G.S.S. in the first round.

References

Living people
1975 births
Charleston Battery players
Finnish footballers
Finnish expatriate footballers
FC Haka players
A-League (1995–2004) players
Association football defenders
Association football midfielders
People from Rauma, Finland
Sportspeople from Satakunta